Federal elections were held in Switzerland on 26 October 1919. The Free Democratic Party emerged as the largest party in the National Council, winning 60 of the 189 seats.

Electoral System
This was the first election after Proportional representation was adopted.

The country was divided into 25 districts - 20 multiple-member districts, with as many as 32 seats, and five were single-member districts. In each, seats were allocated based on parties' vote tallies.

Every district saw multiple parties take seats. In some districts, no party took more than one seat.

Unlike the previous Plurality block voting system, each voter now had just one vote.

Results

National Council

By constituency

Council of States
In several cantons, the members of the Council of States were chosen by the cantonal parliaments.

By canton

References

Switzerland
1919 in Switzerland
Federal elections in Switzerland
October 1919 events
Federal